HMS Isis launched in 1819 was ordered in 1811 as a 50-gun two-decker of the fourth rate Salisbury class, but was redesigned while building, being lengthened on the stocks by , and cut down by one deck to produce a spar-deck frigate, that is, to carry extra guns on the spar deck which linked the forecastle to the quarterdeck.

It was then intended for her to have carried 58 guns as shown in the table, but this weapon 'fit' was amended on 3 June 1823 to complete her as a 50-gun frigate with an unarmed spar deck, and she was later reduced in 1830 to a 44-gun frigate carrying twenty-six 32-pounder guns on the upper deck, twelve more 32-pounder guns on the quarterdeck, and two 32-pounder guns on the forecastle together with two 8-inch shell guns.

References 

 David Lyon, The Sailing Navy List, Conway Maritime Press, London 1993. .
 David Lyon and Rif Winfield, The Sail and Steam Navy List, Chatham Publishing, London 2004. .

Frigate classes
Frigates of the Royal Navy
Ships built in Woolwich
1819 ships
Ships involved in anti-piracy efforts